MediaCorp Channel 8's television series You Can Be an Angel 2 is a nursing drama series produced by MediaCorp Singapore in 2016. The series, which is sponsored by the Care To Go Beyond movement by the Ministry of Health of Singapore, revolves around the lives of a group of dedicated nurses at Ai De Hospital, and how they balance the passion for their job with the challenges they face in their personal lives.

The show aired on Mediacorp Channel 8 from 1 November 2016 to 28 November 2016 with 20 episodes.

Episodic Guide

See also
 Ministry of Health (Singapore)

References

Lists of Singaporean television series episodes